Merrick Watts (born 18 November 1973) is an Australian comedian, radio and television presenter. He is best known for performing stand-up comedy and radio works as part of the comedy duo Merrick and Rosso with Tim Ross.

Career

Stand up
Watts began his career in comedy and first came together with Tim Ross when they teamed up for a one off comedy show in 1996. They had many stand-up shows and comedy tours across Australia and appeared at many comedy festivals. They also published the comedy books Merrick and Rosso, The Book and Merrick and Rosso, The Book Volume 2.

Radio
Watts began his radio career with Tim Ross at Triple J performing a weekly guest spot on the drive-time program on Triple J radio in 1998 as Merrick and Rosso. They became full-time presenters and then in 2001 they moved to newly launched commercial radio station Nova 96.9 for the breakfast radio shift. Co-hosts on the breakfast show included Katrina Blowers, Sami Lukis and Kate Ritchie. Ross left the successful radio program in 2009.

Merrick continued on the breakfast show in 2010 with new co-hosts Scott Dooley and Ricki-Lee Coulter, although he announced on 24 August 2011 that he was leaving the show and the station on 2 September 2011.-

In September 2011, Watts signed with Triple M. He was the host of a drive & night show called Merrick and the Highway Patrol with Rachel Corbett and Julian 'Jules' Schiller. The radio program was cancelled due to poor ratings and came to an end in November 2013.

In late 2013, it was announced that Merrick would co-host the new Breakfast program on 2Day FM alongside Jules Lund & Sophie Monk with Mel B, replacing The Kyle and Jackie O Show.

In October 2014, Southern Cross Austereo announced that Jules, Merrick & Sophie on 2Day FM would be axed due to poor ratings throughout the year and replaced by The Dan & Maz Show.

In 2015, Watts returned to Triple M to host his own drive show, Merrick and Australia which was later renamed Merrickville.

In 2019 he hosted the true crime podcast Police Tape.

Television
The first television series hosted by Merrick and Rosso was Planet Merrick and Rosso (later known as Super Planet Merrick and Rosso) on The Comedy Channel. They had a guest role on top rating Australian drama series All Saints in 2003. In 2003 their television show Merrick and Rosso Unplanned debuted on the Nine Network followed by The B Team on Network Ten in 2005. In 2008, they returned to the Comedy Channel with an original format entitled The Merrick & Rosso Show.

Watts had a regular role in the 2008 television comedy series The Hollowmen as Nick, a senior adviser to the prime minister. In 2009 he played the small but crucial part of Marty Johnstone in Underbelly: A Tale of Two Cities.

Watts has made guest appearances on the television shows Thank God You're Here, Rove Live, ADbc, Studio 10, The Project, All Star Family Feud, Celebrity Name Game, Show Me the Movie!, Have You Been Paying Attention? and Hughesy, We Have a Problem.

In 2013 Watts hosted the 8 part ABC1 TV show Tractor Monkeys.

In 2020, Watts participated the Seven Network's reality program SAS Australia, where he passed selection alongside two other contestants, Sabrina Frederick and Nick 'Honey Badger' Cummins .
In the same year, Merrick Watts appears in the series Operation Buffalo as Captain Jack Allen for one episode.

Other work
Merrick voiced a cartoon shark in the 2011 Movie Extra animated series "Shaaark".

Personal life
Watts married Georgie Sulzberger in 2006. They have a son and a daughter.

He was educated at Eltham High School and Diamond Valley College

Discography

Studio albums

Video albums

Singles

Awards and nominations

ARIA Music Awards
The ARIA Music Awards are a set of annual ceremonies presented by Australian Recording Industry Association (ARIA), which recognise excellence, innovation, and achievement across all genres of the music of Australia. They commenced in 1987.

! 
|-
| 1999 || Teenage Mullet Fury || rowspan="3"| ARIA Award for Best Comedy Release ||  || rowspan="3"|
|-
| 2003 || From Us to Youse || 
|-
| 2008 || Live and Totally Wrong! ||

Other Awards

References

External links 
 

1973 births
Living people
Nova (radio network) announcers
Triple J announcers
Australian stand-up comedians
Australian television presenters
Comedians from Melbourne